Speedwell is an unincorporated community in Claiborne County, Tennessee.

Speedwell is an agricultural community that was first settled c. 1790. It is the site of Powell Valley Elementary School, a Claiborne County public school for kindergarten through grade 8, and a post office that is assigned zip code 37870.

Tennessee State Route 63 runs through Speedwell

References

External links

Unincorporated communities in Claiborne County, Tennessee
Unincorporated communities in Tennessee